Serra is a Turkish feminine given name. People with the name include:

People
 Serra Çağan (born 1997), Turkish footballer
 Serra Kaleli, Turkish diplomat 
 Serra Pirinç (born 1997), Turkish actress
 Serra Yılmaz (born 1954), Turkish actress

Fictional characters
Serra Paylin, a character in the porn film Who's Nailin' Paylin?
Serra, character of the collectible card-game Magic: The Gathering
Col Serra, main character in Star Wars Battlefront: Renegade Squadron

See also
 Serra (disambiguation)

Turkish feminine given names